Dhwani Gautam (born 22 July 1985) is a filmmaker, director and writer who predominantly works in the Gujarati Film Industry and Bollywood.

Early life
Dhwani Gautam was born in Gujarat. He has done his schooling from The Asian School and a degree in film-making from Marwah studios Noida. It all started when he was 13 years old when he watched Yash Chopra's Dilwale Dulhania Le Jayenge. Since then he decided the become a Film Director. Coming from the middle-class family it was quite tough to pursue the career into entertainment industry. He has worked as Radio Jockey in initials days in New Delhi. His struggle started when he shifted to Mumbai to pursue his career.

Career 
Hailing from a middle-class family based in Delhi, Gautam worked small jobs until he became an RJ for a while. Later, he moved to Mumbai. He was hired as an assistant director for the family drama, Baa Bahoo Aur Baby. Later he went on to work for three more serials. He later worked in the Sunny Deol starrer Heroes and the Bobby Deol starrer Nanhe Jaisalmer. After garnering experience in direction and writing, he went on to work for the Punjabi Film Industry.

In 2015, he started work on his own films Romance Complicated which was the first film of his as directorial debut., which was his dream project and it was the first film of Gujarati cinema which has been shot overseas. from that film he has also acted in negative character. Dhwani Gautam put his trust on India's raw star winner Darshan Raval as music director for Romance Complicated

He made his television comeback with cooking show in 2018 named Great Gujarati Cooking Competition.

In 2019 he again come up with the Mr D Show - Get Funny with Dhwani, where 60+ artists such as Malhar Thakar, Parthiv Gohil, Manasi Parekh, Pooja Jhaveri, Raunaq Kamdar and many more came on the show. The show got telecast on Shemaroo Entertainment's OTT platform ShemarooMe.

In 2020 before the starting of pandemic he has started his one of the dream project named Kesariya with Malhar Thakar, Anshul Trivedi and Ritu Bhagwani. The rumor came that movie has stopped due to the lack of fund and Dhwani Gautam has denied it.

Post lock down he has shot the independent Gujarati music song with Geeta Rabari for the song name Pardesiya. and Valamiya 2.0. He has also directed the independent song named Hawa Karda Punjabi song featuring Shama Sikander.

End of 2021 he started his dream project nanmed "Hoon Tari Heer" with Bharat Chawda, Puja Joshi, and Ojas Rawal.

His upcoming project named "Love Atrangi", starring Puja Joshi, Anshul Trivedi and Pooja Jhaveri very soon on the floor.

Filmography

Assistant Director

Films

Television

Music Videos

References

External links
 

Hindi-language film directors
Gujarati-language film directors
Indian art directors
Indian male screenwriters
1985 births
Living people
Indian advertising directors
Film directors from Delhi